Murray Robert Mathieson (born 31 March 1942) is a retired New Zealand field hockey player. He played one match at the 1960 Summer Olympics where his team placed fifth.

References

External links
 

1942 births
Living people
Olympic field hockey players of New Zealand
Field hockey players at the 1960 Summer Olympics